Puccinia dioicae is a plant pathogen that causes rust on goldenrod.

It is common in Iceland, where it infects Taraxacum species and Carex capillaris. Pycniospores and aeciospores are found on Taraxacum sp., and uredospores and teliospores are found on Carex capillaris.

See also
 List of Puccinia species

References

External links
 Index Fungorum
 USDA ARS Fungal Database

Fungal plant pathogens and diseases
dioicae
Fungi described in 1817